Events from the year 1530 in Ireland.

Incumbent
Lord: Henry VIII

Events 

 September – John Óge Kirwan (a.k.a. Jhonock Kirwan) becomes Mayor of Galway.

Deaths
 Richard Mór Burke 9th lord of Clanricarde

References 

 
1530s in Ireland
Ireland
Years of the 16th century in Ireland